Matan Uziel (born 21 April 1985) is an Israeli former high tech entrepreneur and documentary filmmaker. He is also the founder of the Real Women Real Stories channel on YouTube.

Discovery of Elsagate videos (2017–present)

November 2017 
On 22 November, BuzzFeed News published an article about unsettling videos that depict children in disturbing and abusive situations. The information on the article came with the assistance of Matan Uziel whose investigation and report to the Federal Bureau of Investigation on that matter were sent on 22 September, informing its leadership about "tens of thousands of videos available on YouTube that we know are crafted to serve as eye candy for perverted, creepy adults, online predators to indulge in their child fantasies."
On 27 November, YouTube announced in a statement to BuzzFeed News that it had "terminated more than 270 accounts and removed over 150,000 videos", "turned off comments on more than 625,000 videos targeted by child predators" and "removed ads from nearly 2 million videos and over 50,000 channels masquerading as family-friendly content".

Uziel is a vocal proponent against the censorship of YouTube and gave numerous interviews about YouTube's removal of content that "might be sensitive, but serves a public good."

Roman Polanski libel case 
In December 2017, Roman Polanski filed a ₪1.5 million suit in Herzliya Magistrates' Court against Matan Uziel. Polanski maintained that Uziel, through his website, www.imetpolanski.com, falsely reported that five women had come forward to accuse him of raping them. Polanski was suing for libel and defamation of character. Herzliya Magistrates' Court rejected Polanski's request to be exempt from appearing in court after filing the libel suit.

While Polanski gave various reasons for his inability to appear, the presiding judge, Gilad Hess, dismissed these one by one and ordered Polanski to pay Uziel ₪10,000 in costs. In November 2018, it was published that Polanski decided to drop the lawsuit, and was ordered by the court to pay Uziel ₪30,000 (US$8,000) for court costs. The court accepted Uziel's request that the suit not be dropped, but rather that it be rejected, making Polanski unable to sue Uziel again over the same issue in the future.

In late December 2019, in Polanski's interviews with Paris Match and Gazeta Wyborcza, Polanski accused Uziel of carefully orchestrating the attacks on his character and for playing a major role in designing an international campaign to besmirch his name and reputation in order to make his career fall from grace.

In October 2021, it was reported that Uziel was the originating force behind helping Charlotte Lewis to sue and indict Roman Polanski.

Real Women Real Stories 
Founded by Uziel on 8 March 2016, Real Women Real Stories is an international collection of filmed testimonies of women around the world, who submit, share and discuss different contents and topics. Through these documentaries, Uziel's Real Women Real Stories intends to bring viewers face-to-face with different subjects and enable women raise their voice on what they feel needs attention. Since its launch, the project has been featured internationally to great acclaim.

Activism 
Matan Uziel previously served as an ambassador for the National Eating Disorders Association. During his tenure, he created a Change.org petition against Spreadshirt, accusing the e-commerce company for selling shirts that appeared to glamorize eating disorders.

In August 2017, Uziel started a petition calling for convicted child rapist and former priest Paul Shanley to live in a treatment facility where he will have no access to children. As of 5 August 2017, more than 15,000 people had signed the petition, which also called for Shanley's whereabouts to be monitored with a GPS bracelet.

More than a decade ago, a video appeared on the web in which Mexican actress Michelle Vieth appeared naked, a situation that she still considers heartbreaking and difficult to overcome. In July 2017, Vieth contacted Uziel, who helped her to remove the content from the internet.

On 16 February 2018, Katinka Hosszú, a Hungarian three-time Olympic champion and a nine-time long-course world champion, filed for divorce from Shane Tusup. On 25 May 2018, Hosszú's Facebook page was deleted by Tusup, who was the sole administrator of the page. However, on 6 June 2018, Hosszú regained access to her Facebook and then Instagram page with the assistance of Uziel.

In August 2019, Uziel and its organization Real Women Real Stories discovered that shirts bearing iconic photographs of the Holocaust of a man being shot to death while perched over a mass grave are sold on Amazon UK. The items in question featured an infamous photograph known as The Last Jew in Vinnitsa. Uziel forwarded the information to Israel's Channel 2 and following the channel's inquiry, Amazon has removed the items.

References 

Israeli filmmakers
Israeli journalists
1985 births
Israeli people of Bulgarian-Jewish descent
Living people